This page documents the tornadoes and tornado outbreaks of 2011. Extremely destructive tornadoes form most frequently in the United States, Bangladesh, Brazil and Eastern India, but they can occur almost anywhere under the right conditions.  Tornadoes also appear regularly in neighboring southern Canada during the Northern Hemisphere's summer season, and somewhat regularly in Europe, Asia, and Australia.

There were 1,705 tornadoes confirmed in the United States in 2011. It was the second most active year on record, with only 2004 having more confirmed tornadoes. 2011 was an exceptionally destructive and deadly year for tornadoes; worldwide, at least 571 people perished due to tornadoes: 12 in Bangladesh, two in South Africa, one each in New Zealand, the Philippines, Russia and Canada, and 553 in the United States (compared to 564 deaths in the prior ten years combined). Due mostly to several extremely large tornado outbreaks in the middle and end of April and in late May, the year finished well above average in almost every category, with six EF5 tornadoes and nearly enough total tornado reports to eclipse the mark of 1,817 tornadoes recorded in 2004, the current record year for total number of tornadoes.

The 553 confirmed fatalities marks the second-most tornadic deaths in a single year in U.S. history, behind only 1925 in terms of fatalities attributed to tornadic activity.  Most of the damage and over two-thirds of the year's total fatalities were caused by a late-April Super Outbreak and an EF5 tornado that struck Joplin, Missouri in late-May.

Synopsis 

An ongoing outbreak at the end of 2010 continued into the first three hours of 2011. During that period seven tornadoes touched down in Mississippi. However, during the remainder of the month, tornadic activity was suppressed by a cold air mass, with nine additional tornadoes – all weak – taking place. This inactivity continued through much of February before a pattern shift. Two consecutive outbreaks took place on February 25 and 27 – 28, producing a combined 55 tornadoes. Overall, 63 tornadoes were confirmed in the month, ranking it as the fourth-busiest February on record. Activity in March was split between the start and end of the month, with a total of 75 tornadoes touching down, which ran slightly above average for the month.

In early April, a prolific severe weather event produced at least 42 tornadoes among more than 1,200 reports of wind damage, setting the tone for the month. A nearly continuous series of major tornado outbreaks followed thereafter in the remainder of April, including two extreme multi-day tornado outbreaks that were among the largest in U.S. history (one of them also one of the deadliest and the costliest) and two other large tornado outbreaks, and combined they resulted in an incredibly active month from start to finish; it was easily the most active month for tornadoes on record and by an extremely large margin the most active April, with 773 tornadoes touching down.

In an abrupt reversal, the activity did not continue into May (normally the most active month for tornadoes), however, and the first half was remarkably quiet and one of the least active Mays on record as of the middle of the month. That continued for three weeks until significant severe weather returned on May 21, and an extremely deadly tornado hit the following day in a major outbreak. The outbreak continued for the next several days, with over 180 confirmed touchdowns, bringing the month of May near average.

The first day of June brought a rare outbreak into Massachusetts, where several tornadoes touched down, some of them fairly destructive. However, another reversal took place afterward and much of June was fairly quiet, with the exception of an active period in the third week that produced a moderate outbreak. July was also relatively quiet for the most part with below normal activity mostly clustered in the northern Plains. August was more quiet with below normal activity and only about 50 confirmed tornadoes. September and October were also below average. November was somewhat more active, primarily due to two moderate outbreaks in the first half of the month. December saw a return to inactivity for most of the month, but there was a small outbreak of 13 tornadoes on December 22 to close out the year.

Events

United States yearly total

January 

There were 29 tornadoes reported in the US in January, of which 16 were confirmed.

January 1 

A late-season deadly tornado outbreak continued through the early hours of January 1, with seven tornadoes touching down in Mississippi over three hours. Several structures were damaged or destroyed and two people were injured. Near Mississippi Highway 35, thousands of trees were uprooted by the tornado. Another EF3 touched down near Macon, damaging or destroying several structures and one person was injured. Overall damage in the state from tornadoes amounted to $10.4 million.

January 24–25 (Europe) 

In late January, three tornadoes touched down in eastern Europe: two in Turkey and one in Greece. In Kemalpaşa, Turkey, an F1 tornado caused the wall of an industrial building to collapse. Several other structures sustained roof damage. The strongest of these tornadoes was an F2 that touched down in northern Rhodes, destroying small structures and killing several heads of cattle. Accumulations of hail also reached  in Mersin Province, Turkey.

February 

There were 61 tornadoes reported in the US in February, of which 68 were confirmed. The higher final total is due to a large number of late reports.

In addition to the events listed below, there was an F2 tornado in Greece on February 23 that destroyed a restaurant and a brief, weak tornado associated with Cyclone Carlos which struck the town of Karratha in Western Australia.

February 24 

Several tornadoes touched down across parts of the Southern United States. The most significant tornado was in the southeastern part of Nashville, Tennessee where significant damage was reported near Hickory Hollow Mall and near Percy Priest Lake in the evening (with widespread wind damage all across Middle Tennessee), and a tornado emergency was declared shortly thereafter for areas to the northeast in Wilson County where another tornado touched down with injuries. Both tornadoes were rated EF2. Other tornadoes touched down with varying degrees of damage in the Missouri Bootheel, West Tennessee, Mississippi, southwestern Kentucky and parts of Arkansas including three others rated EF2.The overall damage from this system amounted to $1,500,000

February 27–28 

Another severe weather event developed on February 27 and continued into February 28 across the Midwest and South. While a large portion of the damage was due to damaging straight-line winds, at least 35 tornadoes were reported across several states. The most destructive tornado was in Franklin County, Tennessee on the afternoon of February 28 where one person was killed by an EF2 tornado. It was the first killer tornado of 2011. Another strong tornado, rated EF3, resulted in houses destroyed near Eminence, Kentucky. Concentrated tornado activity also occurred in parts of Missouri and Illinois with 22 tornadoes in the region, some as strong as EF2, related to a series of squall lines with many embedded tornadoes. None of those tornadoes resulted in any fatalities. Overall damages from this system amounted to $12,800,000.

March 

There were 95 tornadoes reported in the US in March, of which 75 were confirmed.

March 5–6 

One confirmed EF0 tornado hit the town of Crowley, Louisiana. Another reportedly hit Greene County, Mississippi on March 5. It formed in a squall line, which hit portions of Mississippi, Alabama, and Louisiana. A deadly EF2 tornado struck Rayne, Louisiana early that afternoon, killing a mother while she protected her daughter. At least 12 others were injured. Initial assessments indicate that 62 homes were destroyed and 50 more damaged. Two EF0 tornadoes were also confirmed in eastern North Carolina.

March 8–9 

Several tornadoes touched down once again on March 8 into March 9 from North Texas eastward to the Florida Panhandle, with Louisiana hardest hit. The most destructive tornadoes, rated EF2, touched down just north of New Orleans in St. Tammany Parish.

March 21–23 

A tornado developed in the afternoon of March 21 near Maxwell, California, and it crossed Interstate 5, but however caused no known damage, as it was on the ground for only a few minutes. The same system produced more severe weather ahead of a dry line across eastern Nebraska, where tornadoes were reported northeast of Omaha. Later, a cluster of supercells began producing tornadoes in south-central Iowa, where a tornado was reported in Greenfield, Iowa, and at least 2 tornadoes were reported near Winterset, Iowa. Several funnel clouds were reported in Des Moines, where there was a possible touchdown. These funnels were associated with the storm that produced the first tornado to hit Greenfield and Winterset.

On March 23, more tornadoes and severe weather developed with the most significant tornadoes touching down in East Tennessee where significant damage was reported. Near Greenback in Blount County, an EF3 tornado was confirmed with severe damage in the area. Another notable tornado touched down in southwestern Pennsylvania, most notably in Hempfield Township, Pennsylvania. It was rated EF2.

March 29–31 

On March 29, a warm front over the Gulf of Mexico associated with an upper-level low over Texas moved northward into the Gulf Coast States, bringing scattered severe weather. In Louisiana, three tornadoes touched down, including an EF1 which caused a three-story building to collapse. In Mississippi, one person was killed after lightning caused a house fire. Activity shifted into central Florida on March 30 as a frontal boundary stalled out across the state. During the two-day period, ten tornadoes touched down and a series of squall lines produced widespread wind damage on March 31. Significant damage took place in several communities and damage exceeded $5 million. Seven people were injured when one of the tornadoes hit a local festival.

April 

There were 875 tornadoes reported in the United States in April, of which 773 were confirmed.

That set a new all-time monthly record, significantly exceeding the previous record of 542 in May 2003 and nearly tripling the old record for April (267 in 1974). In Alabama, the monthly (for April) and yearly record was broken with 89 and 98 tornadoes respectively.

April 4–5 

Several storms started to develop in the evening on April 3. Storms in Kansas, Missouri, Iowa and Illinois brought severe thunderstorms to the areas. A tornado watch was issued for Iowa and Illinois as the storms rolled through, and later a severe thunderstorm watch for northeastern Illinois and southeastern Wisconsin. However, there were no reported tornadoes. Continuing eastward, the system entered an environment favoring tornadic development. Two tornadoes were reported in Kentucky during the early afternoon, both rated EF2 and resulting in injuries. Near Hopkinsville, a tornado, confirmed by local emergency services, caused significant damage to a manufacturing plant. Numerous buildings were reported to be destroyed, trapping residents within debris. In addition to the tornadoes, there was widespread wind damage (over 1,400 severe weather reports were received by the Storm Prediction Center, with the vast majority being damaging winds) as an extremely large squall line/serial derecho tracked across the southern United States with wind gusts as high as 90 mph (145 km/h) reported across 20 states, killing at least 9 people, one of the deaths was as a result of an EF2 tornado in Dodge County, Georgia. Numerous power outages also took place due to the extensive wind damage. Nearly 100,000 and 147,000 residences lost power in Tennessee and Georgia respectively.

April 4 (Bangladesh) 
During the afternoon of April 4, a powerful tornado struck seven districts in northern Bangladesh. At least 12 people were killed and more than 150 injured as the tornado destroyed hundreds of homes and uprooted large swaths of vegetation.

April 8–11 

A large storm system with an associated frontal boundary moved northward and eastward across the central United States beginning on April 8. While initial severe weather was limited, a lone supercell broke out ahead of a mesoscale convective system in Pulaski County, Virginia on the eastern end of the warm front that evening. Two tornadoes were confirmed, one of which was an EF2 that caused severe damage in Pulaski, Virginia. Numerous houses were damaged and eight people were injured. During the afternoon of April 9, supercells developed along the warm front and tracked through parts of Kentucky, Tennessee, Virginia, and North Carolina, generating softball sized hail and eight more tornadoes.

During the evening of April 9, several severe thunderstorms developed across Nebraska, South Dakota and Iowa. A single supercell became tornadic over extreme western Iowa, producing a family of ten tornadoes over the course of five hours. Due to a 20-minute warning time, no fatalities took place and only 14 to 16 people were injured. Officials blocked off the town and Governor Terry Branstad issued a disaster proclamation for the town.

Additional tornadic activity developed on April 10 across Wisconsin with several more tornadoes reported there.

April 14–16

During the afternoon of April 14, a significant tornado outbreak started setting up. A PDS (Particularly Dangerous Situation) tornado watch was issued for much of eastern Oklahoma. Supercells explosively developed over central Oklahoma. Storm chasers in the region reported several funnel clouds and two touchdowns, neither of which resulted in damage. Several tornadoes were confirmed through storm chaser video and local emergency management services. A large, intense, multiple-vortex tornado caused severe damage in the towns of Atoka and Tushka where many houses were destroyed or flattened. Numerous injuries were reported in the latter of these areas. Two people were killed and 25 more injured in Tushka. In Arkansas, 2 people were killed when an EF1 downed a tree which landed on a house.

During the late-night hours into the morning of April 15, tornadic activity lessened. However, by the late morning hours, supercell thunderstorms developed again over parts of Mississippi, and tornadoes began to touch down again. A tornado emergency was declared for the northern Jackson metropolitan area as a result at shortly after 11:00 am CDT (1600 UTC). A destructive tornado moved across the area with severe damage and multiple injuries according to WLBT coverage. That afternoon, Mississippi State University spotters confirmed a large tornado in east-central Mississippi and west-central Alabama and another tornado emergency was issued. ABC 33/40 coverage reported that the tornado was 3/4 mile (1.2 km) in width. Over 90 tornado sightings were reported that day and at least eight people were killed in Mississippi and Alabama.

On April 16, another PDS tornado watch, along with a "high risk" alert from the SPC were issued for central and eastern North Carolina.  At least 24 died and 135 were seriously injured in what became North Carolina's worst tornado outbreak in 25 years; tornadoes also struck South Carolina, Virginia, Maryland and Pennsylvania. Twelve of the North Carolina deaths took place in Bertie County; tornado emergencies were issued for Raleigh, Snow Hill, and Wilson at the height of the outbreak. In North Carolina, twelve supercells produced at least 25 tornadoes, with at least 32 counties affected.  A total of 21 businesses and 440 homes were destroyed, 63 of those homes in Raleigh; about 92 businesses and 6,189 homes suffered significant damage, 184 of those homes in Raleigh.

April 19–24 

Yet another severe weather event developed across the Midwest and southern Great Plains on April 19 as another dynamic low pressure system tracked across the area. Thunderstorms began in the late afternoon and early evening with large hail and several tornadoes. Significant damage was reported near Bowling Green, Missouri and Girard, Illinois as a result of tornadoes, the latter of which was rated EF3. Another large tornado was reported near Octavia, Oklahoma before the supercells merged into a very large squall line. Overnight, the squall line tracked eastward with widespread wind damage and many embedded tornadoes across several states, a few as strong as EF2 but most were brief and weak. In the early hours of April 20, 2011, a tornado tore through a neighborhood in Oregon, Ohio leaving some significant damage and no injuries. Also, three tornadoes struck New Albany, Indiana, and Jeffersonville, Indiana. Both are cities just north of Louisville, Kentucky On April 22, the outbreak continued with several tornadoes causing damage in the Midwest, the most notable being a violent EF4 that struck St. Louis, Missouri, causing extensive damage. A few more tornadoes were reported on April 23–24, however most did not cause any severe damage, though one EF2 tornado caused structural damage in the town of Bardwell, Kentucky.

Severe weather once again developed across parts of the Midwest on April 22. The hardest-hit area was parts of the St. Louis metropolitan area. A destructive tornado tracked across the region with severe damage in several communities including houses destroyed in communities such as Bridgeton, Ferguson, Florissant, Hazelwood, Maryland Heights and New Melle. Lambert-St. Louis International Airport was hard hit with severe damage to numerous facilities there and injuries reported. Windows were blown out of the terminals there and airplanes were flipped in the field. Concourse C was the hardest hit, taking nearly a year to reopen; it reopened on April 2, 2012. The tornado was given a rating of EF4 based on finding of flattened houses in Bridgeton. Elsewhere, there were several reported tornadoes, including an EF2 which tracked through Henderson, Webster and Union County.

April 25–28 

Between April 25 and 28, a historic tornado outbreak took place across much of the Southern United States as well as parts of the Midwest and Northeast. With 360 confirmed tornadoes and 324 tornadic fatalities, the outbreak ranks as the largest and one of the worst in United States history. More than three dozen tornadoes were confirmed each day of the event, with 42 on April 25, 55 on April 26, a 24-hour record of 216 on April 27, and 47 on April 28. In terms of violent tornadoes, the event ranks third with 15 EF4/5 storms, behind the 1974 Super Outbreak and 1965 Palm Sunday outbreak.

A large outbreak was possible for April 25–27 as the SPC issued a moderate risk of severe weather for three consecutive days, centered over Arkansas through Tennessee. By the late-afternoon hours of April 25, several tornadoes had been reported across a few states, including two which caused significant damage in Oklahoma and Texas. At 3:25 pm CST (2025 UTC), the SPC issued a PDS tornado watch for much of Arkansas and parts of Missouri, Oklahoma, Texas and Louisiana. Tornadoes were scattered that day until early evening, when an intense tornadic cell tracked near the Little Rock metropolitan area and a tornado emergency was declared for Vilonia, Arkansas. At least four people are known to have died in the town with many more injured.

On April 27, a large tornado struck Tuscaloosa, Alabama, killing 44 people. The Tuscaloosa mayor called the damage "catastrophic." The same tornado hit the northern suburbs of Birmingham, Alabama, shortly thereafter, killing 20 more people. Television reporters in Birmingham, filming the tornado, reported that even from miles away, the
funnel was so wide that they could not zoom their cameras out far enough to get the entire funnel into the frame at once. Over 200 tornadoes were reported during the SPC's reporting day of 1200Z April 27 (7:00 am CDT) to 1200Z April 28 (7:00 am CDT). 324 tornadic deaths were confirmed as a result of the outbreak, with as many as 238 in Alabama alone. The overall death toll also includes 32 deaths in Tennessee, 31 in Mississippi, 14 in Georgia, 5 in Arkansas, and 4 in Virginia, according to state officials.

On April 27, President Barack Obama approved Governor Robert Bentley's request for emergency federal assistance including search and rescue support.

On April 28, 2011, the National Weather Service sent out people to survey the damage; however, with the large number of tornadoes across Alabama, the reports were not finalized for months. By April 30, the death toll from the event (including death tolls from flooding and other severe weather) stood at more than 340 people across six states.

On a lesser note, an F0 tornado (the Fujita scale was still used in Canada) downed trees and ripped siding off store buildings in Fergus, Ontario on April 27.

May

There were 370 tornadoes reported in the United States in May, of which 325 were confirmed.

In addition to the events listed below, two other tornadoes, one in the Philippines and Taiwan, also touched down. The former of these resulted in significant damage and killed one person in Calumpit, Bulacan.

May 3 (New Zealand)

On May 3, a line of showers and thunderstorms tracked into the Northland from the Tasman Sea, bringing unsettled weather to much of the region. The Meteorological Service of New Zealand Limited (MetService) mentioned the possibility of strong thunderstorms being embedded within the line, producing small hail and gusty winds. Significant upward motion in the atmosphere developed in the region surrounding Auckland, prompting the MetService to issue a high-risk of thunderstorms in the area. With low-level wind shear and helicity, the possibility of tornadic activity was present. At 2:55 pm NZST, a hook echo was apparent on the weather radar, indicating strong rotation and a likely tornado.

Several minutes later, around 3:00 pm NZST, a tornado struck the Auckland suburb of Albany. A total of 50 homes sustained varying degrees of damage along the tornado's track. The most severe damage took place at a local shopping mall where large portions of the roof were torn off. One person was killed and at least 20 others were injured here. Damage estimates from the storm were placed in the tens of millions.

May 9–14

On May 9, a strong upper-level ridge over the Mississippi River Valley produced a narrow axis of extreme instability from eastern Nebraska to central South Dakota. In light of this, the SPC issued a slight-risk of severe weather for much of South Dakota and Iowa as well as parts of Minnesota, Missouri, and Nebraska. Enhanced by a mid-level jet, wind shear in the region increased, providing a more favorable environment for strong thunderstorms. During the course of the day, three tornadoes struck South Dakota. The strongest, an EF2 in Pennington County, crumpled a transmission tower. Continuing into May 10, the system slowly moved eastward, shifting the center of severe activity in the Upper-Plains to Minnesota. However, one EF1 tornado touched down, causing significant damage to a garage.

On May 11, an upper-level low moved out of the Four Corners Region into the Central Plains, prompting a moderate-risk of severe weather from the SPC. The main threat from these storms was expected to be large hail, with a considerable region being given a 45 percent chance of hail. Later that day, the moderate-risk was discontinued and replaced by a large area under a slight-risk. According to the SPC, the issuance of a moderate risk was due to an "improper handling of ongoing storms." Tornadic activity during the event was scattered and consisted of short-lived events. In all, 16 tornadoes touched down across five states, Nebraska, Iowa, Missouri, Oklahoma, and Texas. In Iowa, twin EF1 tornadoes struck the city of Lenox, damaging several homes. Continuing eastward, the low became diffuse and produced scattered severe weather on May 12, 13, and 14, with tornadoes confirmed in Nebraska, Illinois, Louisiana, and Ohio.

May 21–26

On May 21, a small system of thunderstorms began to develop in Brown County, Kansas. At the same time, another system formed to the southeast of Emporia, Kansas. The Brown County system developed produced a couple tornadoes over Shawnee County, Kansas, including one near Topeka that caused minor damage. Meanwhile, the Emporia system moved to the northeast, where an EF3 tornado heavily damaged the town of Reading, Kansas. One person was killed, several others were injured, and at least 20 houses were destroyed. Several other tornadoes touched down in the region that evening, all of which were in the EF0–EF1 range.

A moderate risk of severe weather was issued for much of the Midwest south to Oklahoma for May 22. The first tornadic supercell that day developed in the mid-afternoon hours over the western Twin Cities with a swath of damage, especially in and around Minneapolis, Minnesota. An intense tornado also tracked towards Harmony, Minnesota that afternoon and a tornado emergency was issued. Late that afternoon, at about 5:15 p.m. CDT (2215 UTC), a very large and intense multiple-vortex tornado resulted in catastrophic damage in Joplin, Missouri. Many houses and businesses were flattened and some even were blown away in Joplin, the main hospital was heavily damaged and many people were reported to have been trapped in destroyed houses. The Weather Channel video showed entire communities flattened. Early reports suggested there were at least 125 fatalities, but the death toll was later confirmed to be much higher, exactly 158, with another 1,000+ injured. This tornado was given a rating of EF5.

Late in the afternoon on May 24, supercells began forming over western Kansas and Oklahoma, as the National Weather Service predicted a dangerous tornado outbreak. As a line of powerful cells began to take shape, trained spotters reported large tornadoes near El Reno, Oklahoma and in rural Grady County, Oklahoma. One of these swept from Binger to Guthrie, destroying many homes and causing at least nine fatalities. This tornado was rated an EF5, the sixth of the year and second of the outbreak sequence. Three other EF4 tornadoes developed among the many other tornadoes that day.

At around 10:00 p.m. EDT on May 25, an EF3 tornado hit the city of Bedford, Indiana. U.S. Route 50 was temporarily closed due to heavy debris. Also, a tornado had reportedly touched down in Keyser, WV and tracked as far as Berkeley Springs. Three tornadoes also hit the Sacramento Valley of California, north of Sacramento. One tornado rated at EF1, struck east of Artois uprooting hundreds of almond trees, and causing damage to farm equipment and roofing materials. Another tornado rated at EF1, struck south of Durham, uprooting thousands of almond trees, destroying an out building, and damaging a barn. A tornado rated at EF2, struck northwest of Oroville, causing heavy damage to a ranch and a garage. On May 26, strong thunderstorms travelled through the Cumberland Valley in South Central Pennsylvania with reports of EF1 tornadoes near Carlisle, Mechanicsburg, and Hershey. Tornadoes also destroyed the setup for the Harrisburg ArtsFest scheduled to take place the following weekend.

May 29–31

Tornado activity continued across the Northern United States near the end of May, with a couple rounds of storms working eastward and producing scattered tornadoes. On May 29, three EF1 tornadoes were confirmed in Michigan, causing relatively minor damage. Late that evening, another EF1 tornado struck Knoxville, Pennsylvania, damaging at least 25 homes and over 250 trees. On the evening of May 30, more tornadoes occurred over Nebraska, the Dakotas, and Minnesota. The tornadoes in the Fargo, North Dakota area were most impactful, with two high-end EF2 tornadoes striking near the city. Five other tornadoes, one rated EF2 and four rated EF1, struck nearby areas. Numerous homes and other structures were damaged, but no injuries were reported. A final EF1 tornado moved through Bay County, Michigan, on May 31 to end the month, with several homes sustaining minor damage.

June 

There were 177 tornadoes reported in the United States in June, of which 156 were confirmed.

In addition to the events listed below, two tornadoes caused moderate damage in the city of New Plymouth in New Zealand.

June 1 (Northeast) 

In the Northeast, several severe thunderstorms began developing along the tail end of a cold front during the late morning hours of June 1. By the early afternoon, a tornado watch was issued for parts of Connecticut, Massachusetts, Maine, New Hampshire, New Jersey, New York, Pennsylvania and Rhode Island. A rare tornado outbreak (for the region) began late that afternoon with several tornadoes confirmed in Maine and Massachusetts.

That afternoon, an EF3 tornado occurred in downtown Springfield, Massachusetts and continued east for 39 miles devastating the towns of Westfield, Wilbraham, Monson, Brimfield, Sturbridge, Southbridge and Charlton. Major damage in the area was reported; there were some roof collapses in downtown businesses and damage to the brick structures. Numerous injuries were reported there. Significant damage was also reported in West Springfield, Monson and several other communities where houses were reported to have been destroyed or flattened. Three deaths have been directly attributed to the Springfield tornado, the first killer tornado in Massachusetts since 1995.

June 18–22 

On June 19, the Storm Prediction Center issued a moderate risk of severe weather for the Central Plains. By the evening hours, several tornadoes had touched down over rural areas. 48 tornadoes have been reported to the Storm Prediction Center.

During the afternoon of June 20, a PDS tornado watch was issued for much of central Nebraska and north-central Kansas due to the threat of significant tornadoes. Additionally, very large hail, at least  in diameter, is expected within the watch area. Around 1:00 p.m. local time, storm chasers reported a large EF3 tornado on the ground north of Hill City, Kansas and again later that afternoon near Elm Creek, Nebraska. Numerous other tornadoes were reported across the region including near Ravenna and in York County, some reported to have been very large and intense, but mostly over open country. Tornado warnings are stretching from North Dakota to Kansas. Additionally, a major derecho event may develop farther south – a PDS Severe Thunderstorm Watch was issued for parts of Oklahoma and North Texas as well. On the 21st, tornado watches were issued for several areas, including central Minnesota and Wisconsin, southern Illinois and parts of Missouri, and lower Michigan. Tornadoes were reported in Anoka County, Minnesota, and Green Lake and Fond du Lac Counties in Wisconsin. Additionally, local law enforcement reported a tornado in Allegan County in Michigan, with photos taken also showing what looked like a tornado, but no damage was seen in the area, and the National Weather Service determined it to have been low hanging clouds. Meanwhile, a major derecho event impacted the Chicago Metropolitan Area. The worst damage was in Wheeling, Illinois.

A series of tornadoes tracked across the Louisville, Kentucky area late on June 22. A total of five tornadoes were confirmed in the area, including two that were rated EF2. One of the tornadoes directly hit Churchill Downs severely damaging several buildings on the site. Other significant damage was reported in several industrial parks in the metropolitan area with buildings heavily damaged. Tornadoes were also confirmed in Mississippi, Tennessee, Michigan, and Indiana.

July 

There were 92 tornadoes reported in the United States in July, of which 102 were confirmed. The higher final total is due to a large number of late reports.

In Alberta, Canada, at least four tornadoes touched down on various days, causing relatively minor damage. 12 buildings over a one block area were affected. Some damaged roofs and flooded streets.

July 1 

On July 1, an extreme straight-line wind and derecho event took place over South Dakota, Minnesota, Wisconsin and Iowa. Winds as high as  caused extensive damage, especially along the border of Minnesota and Wisconsin. In addition to the straight-line winds, seven tornadoes touched down, two of which were rated EF2.

July 11 

It also spawned a weak EF0 tornado that damaged crops in Moorland, Iowa.

July 16–17 

Numerous tornadoes touched down over the northern Plains on both July 16 and 17 at the edge of a very hot, humid air mass. At least 16 tornadoes were reported, mostly in North Dakota. Most remained over open country but a few caused significant damage, including a house which was destroyed from a strong EF3 tornado in LaMoure County.

August 

There were 52 tornadoes reported in the United States in August, of which 59 were confirmed. The higher final total is due to late reports.

August 1 (Russia) 
On August 1, an F2 tornado struck the city of Blagoveshchensk, Russia. Remaining on the ground for 13 minutes, the storm damaged over 100 homes, 150 cars and uprooted 150 trees. One person was killed and twenty-eight were injured, four of whom were hospitalized. Losses from the tornado were estimated at €1.2 to 2 million ($1.8 to 2.9 million). In the wake of the storm, officials declared a state of emergency to help speed up recovery efforts.

August 10 

Early on August 10, a strong tornado (a rarity in mid-summer in Oklahoma) hit near Locust Grove, Oklahoma embedded in a larger thunderstorm complex. The tornado destroyed a mobile home killing one person (the first killer tornado since June 1 in the US) and injuring two others. The tornado was rated as an EF2.

August 19 

An isolated tornado, rated EF1 with winds up to  struck Wausaukee, Wisconsin, killing one person.

August 21 (U.S. and Canada) 

A tornadic waterspout touched down late in the afternoon over Lake Huron, coming ashore at Goderich, Ontario. The tornado struck the downtown area nearly directly with severe damage. Many buildings were damaged or destroyed in the community by the tornado, the strongest in Ontario since 1996. There are early reports of 2 other tornadoes in the region. At least 37 people were injured and a 61-year-old worker at a salt mine was killed as winds of  raged. The storm was rated an F3 tornado by Environment Canada. An EF2 tornado was also confirmed in western New York, near Conquest.

August 26–28 

The outer bands and core of Hurricane Irene produced numerous tornadoes as it made landfall in North Carolina and tracked northward. They were reported across several states along the immediate east coast. One tornado near Columbia, North Carolina (rated EF2) resulted in severe destruction to several houses and injuries including manufactured homes destroyed while an EF1 tornado in Lewes, Delaware also resulted in significant tornado-related damage.

September 

There were 65 tornadoes reported in the United States in September, of which 51 were confirmed.

September 3–7 

Slow-moving Tropical Storm Lee resulted in at least 55 tornado reports along the immediate northern Gulf Coast beginning on September 3 and into September 4, inching inland on the afternoon of September 4. Several areas of damage, some significant, was reported from central Louisiana to the western Florida Panhandle.

A moderate risk of severe weather, a rare occurrence when associated with a tropical cyclone, was issued for September 5 in Alabama and Georgia, with numerous tornadoes possible. The most concentrated tornadic activity that day took place in northern and central Georgia, particularly around Atlanta. In addition, an EF1 tornado associated with an unrelated cold front touched down in Amsterdam, New York.

October 

There were 24 tornadoes reported in the United States in October, of which 23 were confirmed.

October 2 (South Africa) 
Two tornadoes occurred in South Africa on October 2, one in the Free State and one in the East Rand, Gauteng. Several homes were destroyed, and two people were killed in the township of Duduza.

October 13 

Several tornadoes touched down in central Virginia on October 13 as a result of low-topped supercells that developed in the area. The most severe damage was in New Kent County where an elementary school was heavily damaged. Several houses were also damaged. Houses were also damaged in Louisa County. One other tornado took place near Dumfries, Virginia along Interstate 95 at the peak of rush hour, but no severe damage was reported. In total, five tornadoes were confirmed.

October 18 

At least three tornadoes touched down in Florida late on October 18. Dozens of homes were damaged in Broward County by a tornado with winds of 120 mph, which left a damage path more than a mile long and half a mile wide. A second tornado with wind speeds of 85 mph struck Indiantown, and a third tornado with winds up to 65 mph caused major damage to a home in Indiro.

November 

There were 60 tornadoes reported in the United States in November, of which 46 were confirmed.

November 7–8 

A series of tornadoes touched down across the south-central United States, particularly Texas, Oklahoma, and Louisiana, on November 7 and 8 as a storm system tracked across the region. A total of 21 tornadoes were confirmed across the region, causing sporadic damage. One of the tornadoes was rated as an EF4, destroying the Oklahoma State University agronomy research station near Tipton, Oklahoma, the first F4 or EF4 tornado in Oklahoma in the month of November since records began in 1950. Most of the tornadoes, however, remained in very rural areas, mainly impacting trees and forested areas. No injuries reported with the tornadoes.

November 14–16 

Several tornadoes occurred across the United States beginning the afternoon of November 14 and continuing through November 16. On November 14, two EF2 tornadoes were confirmed in southwestern New York, a rare occurrence there so late in the year, while another tornado struck Paoli, Indiana, causing considerable damage in downtown. After a brief tornado on November 15 in San Jacinto County, Texas, numerous tornadoes struck the Southern United States throughout the day on November 16, resulting in severe damage and injuries.

A total of 20 tornadoes occurred on November 16 in a small but deadly outbreak. Some tornadoes caused considerable damage, especially in Mississippi, Alabama, and the Carolinas. A series of supercell thunderstorms developed and produced multiple tornadoes. Five tornadoes were rated EF2, one of which destroyed multiple homes near Laurel, Mississippi, and injured 15 people. An EF1 tornado west of Tangipahoa, Louisiana heavily damaged a home and pushed it several feet off of its foundation. This tornado caused EF1-level damage in Auburn and EF2 damage in Hamilton. Four people were injured by the tornado: two in Auburn and two in Hamilton. A deadly tornado later touched down near Rock Hill, South Carolina, causing severe damage and three fatalities. Another destructive EF2 tornado touched down east of Linwood, North Carolina, and impacted residential and commercial areas south of Thomasville. Numerous homes and businesses were destroyed, two people were killed, and several people were trapped in destroyed structures and required rescue. Over 75 structures were damaged or destroyed by the tornado. A sixth fatality, due to straight-line winds, occurred in Forsyth County, Georgia.

November 29 (United Kingdom) 

An F0 tornado tore through a Caravan Park near Llanfwrog, causing minor damage. Another tornado hit Manchester causing damage to trees and buildings. One woman was taken to the hospital with minor injuries. The Lancashire Police reported having received a report of a "small tornado" around 14:30 GMT. A tornado rated F1 (T3) was confirmed in Rossington, South Yorkshire during the evening of November 28, damaging roofs on houses.

December 

There were 15 tornadoes reported in the United States in December, all of which were confirmed.

December 20–22 

After a lull in activity, fifteen tornadoes were confirmed across Louisiana, Alabama, and Georgia from December 20 to December 22, making up all of the United States tornado activity during the month. The strongest of the tornadoes, an EF3 in Georgia on December 22, resulted in severe damage in parts of Floyd and Gordon counties, including houses destroyed. Four people were injured in Gordon County, and three others were injured by an EF2 tornado near Rome.

December 25 (Australia) 
The outer north-western suburbs of Melbourne, Australia were hit by three reported tornadoes on Christmas Day after a series of severe thunderstorms moved through the city. The first tornado was reported in Fiskville, approximately 15 km west of Bacchus Marsh. The second was reported in the city of Melton. Another tornado was reported in Taylors Lakes. The storms and tornadoes were accompanied with extremely heavy rainfall, flash flooding, high winds and tennis ball-sized hail.

See also 
 Tornado
 Tornadoes by year
 Tornado records
 Tornado climatology
 Tornado myths
 List of tornado outbreaks
 List of F5 and EF5 tornadoes
 List of F4 and EF4 tornadoes
 List of F4 and EF4 tornadoes (2010–2019)
 List of North American tornadoes and tornado outbreaks
 List of 21st-century Canadian tornadoes and tornado outbreaks
 List of European tornadoes and tornado outbreaks
 List of tornadoes and tornado outbreaks in Asia
 List of Southern Hemisphere tornadoes and tornado outbreaks
 List of tornadoes striking downtown areas
 List of tornadoes with confirmed satellite tornadoes
 Tornado intensity
 Fujita scale
 Enhanced Fujita scale
 International Fujita scale
 TORRO scale

References

External links 
 State of the Climate: Tornadoes: 2011 (NCDC)
 United States Tornadoes of 2011 (SPC)
 The Online Tornado FAQ (by Roger Edwards, SPC) – spc.noaa.gov
 U.S. Severe Weather Map –  Weather Underground
 WSI Lightning Networks – USPLN, NAPLN and GLN – Lightning map
 The Tornado Monologues – April 2011 Tornado Story Archive

 
Tornado-related lists by year
Torn
2011 meteorology